Ray Nettles (August 1, 1949 – September 29, 2009) was a football linebacker at the University of Tennessee who played professional Canadian football from 1972-1980.  He was a five-time Canadian Football League All-Star and Hall of Famer.

Early years
Nettles was born in Jacksonville, Florida and graduated from Englewood High School in 1968. In his senior year, he was Duval County defensive player of the year and third team All-State.

Nettles accepted a scholarship to the University of Tennessee but spent his first two years as backup to two-time Pro Bowler Jack Reynolds. In the two seasons that Nettles started as linebacker, Tennessee's record was 21-3 and he was named to the All-SEC team in 1971.

Professional career
The Miami Dolphins drafted him in 1972, but he chose the CFL because they offered twice as much money and the opportunity to play immediately. At Miami, he would have competed for a starting job against All-Pro linebacker Nick Buoniconti. Nettles was quoted in a 1999 Florida Times-Union article, "It's not like I was afraid to play in the NFL. I could have had success there, but I already waited my turn behind Jack Reynolds at Tennessee, and I didn't want to do that again. I wanted to prove myself right away."

Nettles started his pro career for the BC Lions in 1972 and was named to the All-Star team his first year. In his second year, he won the 1973 CFL's Most Outstanding Lineman Award and was again named to the All-Star team. He remained with the Lions through the 1976 season, then played for the Toronto Argonauts in 1977, the Hamilton Tiger-Cats in 1978, the Ottawa Rough Riders in 1979, and the Calgary Stampeders in 1980. He was inducted into the Canadian Football Hall of Fame in 2005.

Personal life
While playing football, Nettles was known as a tough guy with long hair who partied hard and drove fast motorcycles. His profile on the Canadian Football Hall of Fame website states: "He became known as much for his colourful off field personality as for his on field feistiness."
Nettles struggled throughout much of his adult life with alcohol and cocaine additions, which contributed to three divorces and multiple attempts at rehabilitation. He was finally successful in November 2008 after a six-week stay at Willingway Hospital. He explained his attitude in a July 2009 interview:

In my mind, I wasn't  to live past 50, so I didn't take rehabilitation seriously the first few times I tried it. I was always standing on the edge, looking over a cliff, but stepping backwards. A few times, I slipped and saw a couple of the rocks fall and God spared me many times. I just never could figure out why until this past year.

As part of his sobriety, Nettles became a Christian and regained self-respect and dignity, which allowed him to live his final months at peace.

Death
Nettles died at a hospice in Jacksonville, Florida on September 29, 2009, after a long battle with liver and lung cancer.

References

External links
 Profile at Canadian Football Hall of Fame
 Profile at Canadian Football League

1949 births
2009 deaths
American players of Canadian football
BC Lions players
Calgary Stampeders players
Canadian Football Hall of Fame inductees
Canadian football linebackers
Deaths from liver cancer
Deaths from lung cancer in Florida
Hamilton Tiger-Cats players
Ottawa Rough Riders players
Players of American football from Jacksonville, Florida
Tennessee Volunteers football players
Toronto Argonauts players